The Mississippi Valley Conservation Authority (MVCA) (formerly Mississippi Valley Conservation (MVC)) is a conservation authority in the province of Ontario. It is headquartered in Carleton Place, Ontario and serves a 4450 km watershed located across eleven municipalities. The organization is responsible for both the Mississippi River watershed and the Carp River watershed.

Conservation areas

 Carp River
 K&P
 Mill of Kintail
 Morris Island
 Palmerston-Canonto
 Purdon

References

External links
 

Conservation authorities in Ontario